The A.D. Club is a final club established at Harvard University in 1836, the continuation of a chapter of the Alpha Delta Phi fraternity existing as an honorary chapter until 1846, and then as a regular chapter until the late 1850s.  At that time, owing to the prevailing sentiment against such societies, it became a strictly secret society, known among its members as the "Haidee," the name of a college boat. The chapter surrendered its charter in 1865, and has since existed as the A.D. Club.

Clubhouse 

In 1872, the club rooms were moved from the upper story of a brick house on Palmer Street to a building on Brattle Street.  These rooms were occupied until 1878, when a club-house was obtained on the corner of Mt. Auburn and Dunster Streets.
In 1900, the club moved to its present club-house at 1 Plympton St.

Notable members 

 Benjamin C. Bradlee - Executive Editor of the Washington Post. Oversaw coverage of the Watergate scandal
 James Blake - Professional tennis player, reached a high of number 4 in the world.
 David McKendree Key - United States Ambassador, served under at least six U. S. Presidents from Warren G. Harding to Dwight D. Eisenhower.
 Stephen Minot Weld - Scion of the Weld Family of Boston. Schoolmaster, real estate investor and politician.
 J. Harleston Parker - American architect, founder Parker, Thompson & Rice.
 Henry Lee Higginson - Noted American businessman and philanthropist, founder of Boston Symphony Orchestra.
 Murray Taylor - Composer of "Ten Thousand Men of Harvard"
 Manning Ferguson Force - was a lawyer, judge and soldier from Ohio. Recipient of the Congressional Medal of Honor for his actions during the Civil War.
 Charles William Eliot - American academic and President of Harvard University.
 Robert Bacon - American businessman who served as an ambassador to France, U.S. Assistant Secretary of State, and U.S. Secretary of State.
 Amory Houghton, Jr. - United States Congressman

References

External links
 "A.D. CLUB, INC. Summary Screen", The Commonwealth Of Massachusetts, William Francis Galvin, Secretary Of The Commonwealth, Corporations Division

Harvard University